John Beaufort may refer to:

 John Beaufort, 1st Earl of Somerset (c. 1373–1410) 
 John Beaufort, 1st Duke of Somerset (1403–1444)
 John Beaufort, Marquess of Dorset (c. 1455–1471)
 Jean J. Beaufort (1832–1897), known as John Joseph Beaufort, Union Army Medal of Honor recipient